Ahn Ji-ho may refer to:
 Ahn Ji-ho (footballer)
 Ahn Ji-ho (actor)